Boyd is a town in Wise County, Texas, United States. The population was 1,416 in 2020. It is 30 miles (48 km) northwest of the Dallas–Fort Worth metroplex.

History
Originally named Greasy Bend in reference to the local hog fattening industry, the settlement was established in the early 1890s by farmers. The Chicago, Rock Island and Pacific Railroad reached the town in 1893 and the settlement was subsequently renamed Parkhurst in reference to one of the railroad's officials. Not long afterwards, the town renamed again to Boyd (another railroad official) to avoid possible confusion with the nearby Park Springs.

Geography

Boyd is located at  (33.084347, –97.563208).

Demographics

As of the 2020 United States census, there were 1,416 people, 442 households, and 344 families residing in the town.

Education

The Town of Boyd is served by the Boyd Independent School District. The school district includes four schools: elementary, intermediate, middle, and high schools. Recently, a new Boyd High School was constructed. It is three times the size of the former high school building, needed to accommodate a growing population.

Sports

Boyd's High School football team, the Boyd Yellowjackets, are the 1983 AA & 2004 Division I—AA State Champions. The Yellowjackets were also 1999 AA Division I State Finalists. The Lady Jacket basketball team went to the AA State Finals in 1980 and 2001. The Boys Cross Country team went to the AAA State meet in 2014-15.

Notable people

 Murry Hammond from the Dallas-based rock band the Old 97's is from Boyd
 Peter Mayhew, most famous for his role as Chewbacca in the Star Wars films, resided in Boyd until his death in 2019
 Billy Joe Tolliver, former Texas Tech and San Diego Chargers QB, among others, is from Boyd

References

Towns in Texas
Towns in Wise County, Texas
Dallas–Fort Worth metroplex
Populated places established in the 1890s
1890s establishments in Texas